The 1988 Czechoslovak motorcycle Grand Prix was the penultimate round of the 1988 Grand Prix motorcycle racing season. It took place on the weekend of 26–28 August 1988 at the Masaryk Circuit located in Brno, Czechoslovakia.

500 cc race report
Wayne Gardner on pole. Wayne Rainey gets a good start, but Tadahiko Taira gets the first turn.

At the end of the first lap, it's Gardner, Taira, Christian Sarron, Rainey, and Eddie Lawson in 7th. Lawson needs to finish behind Gardner to win the championship.

Gardner is getting a gap, but Lawson has moved to 2nd, while Sarron highsides out.

After the race there's a dispute between Lawson and Rainey, Lawson perhaps angry that Team Roberts wasn't playing by the Yamaha team book with Rainey making 2nd place so difficult to get.

Rumors were also that Lawson and team manager Giacomo Agostini were about to split, and Lawson would be going to Rothmans Honda with Gardner.

500 cc classification

References

Czech Republic motorcycle Grand Prix
Czechoslovak
Motorcycle Grand Prix
Czechoslovak motorcycle Grand Prix